Hersham is a hamlet south of Kilkhampton in Cornwall, England. Hersham is near Grimscott. It is in the civil parish of Launcells.

References

Hamlets in Cornwall